Sport shooting at the 2017 Games of the Small States of Europe was held at the Tiro a Volo San Marino
Via dei Cerri and Shooting Area Via Genghe di Atto 143 in San Marino on 30 May and 2 June 2017.

Medal table

Medalists

Men

Women

References

External links 
Official results
Shooting Air – Results book
Shooting Clay – Results book

Games of the Small States of Europe
2017 Games of the Small States of Europe
2017
Shooting sports in San Marino